Notes on Nationalism is an essay completed in May 1945 by George Orwell and published in the first issue of the British magazine Polemic in October 1945. Political theorist Gregory Claeys insists it is a key source for understanding Orwell's novel Nineteen Eighty-Four.

In the essay, Orwell tries to define nationalism and argues that it causes people to disregard common sense and become more ignorant towards facts. Orwell shows his concern for the social state of Europe and the rest of the world because of the increasing influence of nationalistic sentiment in a large number of countries.

The essay was soon translated into French and Dutch, Italian and Finnish (in which the word nationalism was represented by chauvinisme). The article was abridged in the translated versions by omitting details of particular relevance to British readers. A short introduction, based on material supplied by Orwell, preceded the translated abridgements.

Content
The essay was written during the final stages of World War II while Europe had just witnessed the destructive effects of political movements. Nazism is used as an example of how nationalism can cause havoc between groups of people and can instigate ignorance within those groups. Orwell compares Nazism with other forms of nationalistic ideologies to generate an overall argument and questions the function of nationalism.

Nationalism is the name that Orwell gives to the propensity of "identifying oneself with a single nation or other unit, placing it beyond good and evil and recognising no other duty than that of advancing its interests". Its occurrence is visible throughout history, and it is prevalent. Nationalism is defined as alignment to a political entity but can also encompass a religion, race, ideology or any other abstract idea. Examples of such forms of nationalism given by Orwell include Communism, political Catholicism, Zionism, anti-Semitism, Trotskyism and pacifism.

Orwell additionally argues that his definition of "nationalism" is not equal to the notion, held by himself and most other people, of "patriotism": "Patriotism is of its nature defensive....  Nationalism, on the other hand, is inseparable from the desire for power." Orwell explains that he uses the expression "nationalism" for lack of a better alternative to label the concept that he describes in his essay.

Orwell argues that nationalism largely influences the thoughts and actions of people, even in such everyday tasks as decision-making and reasoning. The example provided is of asking the question: "Out of the three major Allies, which contributed most to the fall of Nazism?". People aligned with the United States, Britain and the Soviet Union would consider their country first before they attempt to search for supportive arguments.

One of the themes that Orwell discusses is the effect of nationalistic sentiment on human thinking. Nationalism causes dishonesty within people because, he argues, every nationalist, having chosen one side, persuades himself that his side is the strongest, regardless of the arguments against the faction. From that sense of superiority, people then argue for and defend their faction. The slightest slur or criticism from another faction causes them to retort or be violent since they realise they are serving a larger entity, which provides them with that sense of security and so they must defend it.

Additionally, they may become ignorant to the point of self-deception:

The nationalist not only does not disapprove of atrocities committed by his own side, but he has a remarkable capacity for not even hearing about them. For quite six years the English admirers of Hitler contrived not to learn of the existence of Dachau and Buchenwald. And those who are loudest in denouncing the German concentration camps are often quite unaware, or only very dimly aware, that there are also concentration camps in Russia. Huge events like the Ukraine famine of 1933, involving the deaths of millions of people, have actually escaped the attention of the majority of English russophiles.

Such people become susceptible to bias by acknowledging only information that they judge as true, as emotions hinder them in properly addressing facts. People believe in what they approve in their own minds as true to the point that they deem it as an absolute truth: "More probably they feel that their own version was what happened in the sight of God, and that one is justified in rearranging the records accordingly".

Orwell also criticises the silliness and the dishonesty of intellectuals who become more nationalistic on behalf of another country for which they have no real knowledge, rather than their native country. Orwell argues that much of the romanticism, written about leaders such as Stalin, for example, and describe their might, power and integrity, was written by intellectuals. An intellectual is influenced by a certain public opinion, "that is, the section of public opinion of which he as an intellectual is aware". He is surrounded by scepticism and disaffection, which is not very compatible with a very deep attachment to his own country: "He still feels the need for a Fatherland, and it is natural to look for one somewhere abroad. Having found it, he can wallow unrestrainedly in exactly those emotions from which he believes that he has emancipated himself".

Also, Orwell provides three characteristics to describe those who follow nationalistic sentiment: obsession, instability and indifference to reality.

Obsession refers to how nationalists passionately tender to their faction: "As nearly as possible, no nationalist ever thinks, talks, or writes about anything except the superiority of his own power unit. It is difficult if not impossible for any nationalist to conceal his allegiance.... he will generally claim superiority for it (if the chosen unit of allegiance is a country) not only in military power and political virtue, but in art, literature, sport, structure of the language, the physical beauty of the inhabitants, and perhaps even in climate, scenery and cooking. He will show great sensitiveness about such things as the correct display of flags, relative size of headlines and the order in which different countries are named". 

"Some nationalists are not far from schizophrenia, living quite happily amid dreams of power and conquest which have no connexion with the physical world". Orwell argues that uncertainty over the disasters reported ("What were the rights and wrongs of the Warsaw rising of 1944? Is it true about the German gas ovens in Poland?") makes it "easier to cling to lunatic beliefs.... Since nothing is ever quite proved or disproved, the most unmistakeable fact can be impudently denied.... The nationalist is often somewhat uninterested in what happens in the real world".

Regarding instability, Orwell reasons that nationalism can become ironical in various ways. Many of the leaders revered by nationalist factions are outright foreigners, who do not even belong to the country that they have glorified. More often, they are "from peripheral areas where nationality is doubtful". For instance, Stalin was a Georgian, and Hitler was an Austrian, but both were respectively idolised in Russia and Germany.

Indifference to reality refers to "the power of not seeing resemblances between similar sets of facts" and is a feature of all nationalists, according to Orwell. He describes how nationalism clouds people from perceiving facts of the real world. The use of torture, hostages, forced labour, mass deportations, imprisonment without trial, forgery, assassination, the bombing of civilians all prove to be irrelevant towards the notion of "good or bad", and there is no outrage from within the public, as the atrocities are committed by "our side". Some nationalists even go into the trouble of defending such actions and search for arguments to support their case.

Orwell provides the example of the liberal News Chronicle publishing images of Russians hanged by the Germans to depict the shocking barbarity of the Germans and then, a few years later, publishing with warm approval very-similar photographs of Germans hanged by the Russians. Another similar instance is another newspaper publishing, with seeming approval, photographs of the baiting by a mob in Paris of scantily-clad women, who collaborated with the Nazis. The photographs strongly resembled the Nazi images of Jews being baited by the Berlin mob in the years before the war.

See also
 La Trahison Des Clercs, a 1927 book by Julien Benda, which deals with many of the same themes as Notes on Nationalism.
 Gregory Claeys. "Orwell's 'Notes on Nationalism' and Nineteen Eighty-Four", in: Thomas Horan, ed. Critical Insights: Nineteen Eighty-Four (The Salem Press, 2016), pp. 71-82, connects the text with Nineteen Eighty-Four.

References

External links
: Notes on Nationalism – Original essay. Public domain in Australia and the Russian Federation.
"Notes on Nationalism" at the Orwell Foundation website

Essays by George Orwell
Works originally published in Polemic (magazine)
1945 essays
Works about nationalism
Anti-nationalism